Suli is a 1978 Indian Kannada-language film, produced and directed by B. S. Ranga. The film stars Lokesh, Ashok, Ramakrishna and M. S. Sathya. The film has musical score by Upendra Kumar.

Cast

Lokesh
Ashok as Cheluva
Ramakrishna as Thimma
M. S. Sathya
Nimbalkar
L. R. Ananth
Shani Mahadevappa
Shivaprakash
B. Prakash
Jr. Mahadev
Master Raja
Chandrakala as Savithri
Susheela Naidu
Papamma as Sathajji
Jr. Bharathi
Shantha Prakash
Indiradevi

Soundtrack
The music was composed by Upendra Kumar.

References

External links
 
 

1970s Kannada-language films
Films scored by Upendra Kumar
Films based on Indian novels
Films directed by B. S. Ranga